Greta Naemi Onnela (23 August 1910 – 10 August 1957) was a Finnish diver. She competed in the women's 10 metre platform event at the 1928 Summer Olympics.

References

External links
 

1910 births
1957 deaths
Finnish female divers
Olympic divers of Finland
Divers at the 1928 Summer Olympics
Sportspeople from Vaasa